Žutautas is a surname. Notable people with the surname include:

Darius Žutautas (born 1978), Lithuanian footballer
Giedrius Žutautas (born 1974),  Lithuanian footballer
Raimondas Žutautas (born 1972), Lithuanian footballer and coach
Vaidas Žutautas (born 1973), Lithuanian footballer